The SS Agwiworld was a tanker ship that was able to evade an attack off the coast of California in the early days of World War II. Agwiworld was built by Sun Shipbuilding in Chester, Pennsylvania on the Delaware River. Agwiworlds keel was laid down on July 28, 1920. The vessel was launched on December 22, 1920, and delivered on January 19, 1921.  Agwiworld was owned and operated by Richfield Oil Company and homeport was Los Angeles, California.

After the Attack on Pearl Harbor on December 7, 1941 the United States entered World War II. The Imperial Japanese Navy sent submarines to attack ships off Coastal California. The first shell missed and exploded off the stern, Captain Frederick Goncalves saw the sub  to the west. Goncalves took evasive moves, zigzagging to avoid the incoming shells and to flee the site. Goncalves had a distress call sent to the US Navy. Captain Genichi Shibata of I-23 was not able to get off accurate fire, nor able to follow the Agwiworld, as the water was rough that day. The sub I-23 was faster than the Agwiworld, but with the heavy swells Shibata called off the attack. Shibata's gun crew were on the deck and the heavy swells risked washing his crew overboard. Agwiworld steamed to Santa Cruz, away from the sub, looking for a safe port. After the sub fired its last shell, it submerged. People, including golfers, on the Monterey peninsula saw the shells exploding around the ship as she entered the bay still zigzagging at top speed. Salinas Air Base sent out observation planes to look for the sub, but due to poor visibility they found nothing. It is reported that the Japanese submarine I-23 was lost with all 96 crew members off Hawaii on February 28, 1942. In 1949 the Agwiworld was sold to Cia. Atlantica Pacifica S.A. (Atlantic & Pacific Corporation) of Panama City, Panama and renamed the SS Edgewater. In 1954 the ship was scrapped by the British Iron and Steel Corporation.

Five shells and one torpedo killed five crew members and wrecked the Emidio, which ran aground.

See also
 
 
 California during World War II

References

1920 ships
Ships built by the Sun Shipbuilding & Drydock Company
Tankers of the United States
Maritime incidents in December 1941
United States home front during World War II